Astathes holorufa is a species of beetle in the family Cerambycidae. It was described by Breuning in 1968. It is known from China.

References

H
Beetles described in 1968